The Investors Chronicle is a weekly magazine in the United Kingdom for private investors and is published by the Financial Times Group. The magazine publishes articles about global markets and sectors, and news on corporate actions such as takeovers and share issues. It was established in 1860, and has been considered a "highly influential magazine".

History 
The Investors Chronicle was first published on 9 June 1860 as the Money Market Review. In 1914, it merged with the Investor's Chronicle and Journal of Finance. In 1928, publication was taken over by Brendan Bracken. In 1967, the Investors Chronicle merged with the Stock Exchange Gazette. And in 1978, it re-established its connection with the Financial Times, by becoming part of the FT Group. It is now published by FT Specialist, part of FT Group, which is owned by Japanese media group Nikkei.

Content 
Investors Chronicle is edited by Rosie Carr and has a staff of 30 journalists. Their names are listed in the people panel in the magazine. The magazine focuses on coverage of companies in the FTSE 100, 250, 350 and 500 companies as well as companies listed on the Alternative Investment Market (AIM).

Editors
 Geoffrey J. Holmes (before 1914–1937)
 Harold Wincott (1938–1959)
 John Cobb
 Andreas Whittam Smith (1970–1977)
 ?
 Gillian O'Connor (1982–1994)
 ?
 Ceri Jones (1996–2002)
 Matthew Vincent (2002–?)
 Oliver Ralph (2007–2009)
 Jonathan Eley (2009–2012)
 John Hughman (2012–2021)
Rosie Carr (2021–)

Further reading

References

External links 
 
 Information about Investors Chronicle at the Financial Times group

Business magazines published in the United Kingdom
Magazines established in 1860
Weekly magazines published in the United Kingdom
1860 establishments in the United Kingdom
Financial Times